The Jama Masjid is a  mosque located in Delanipur area of Port Blair in Andaman and Nicobar Islands in the India.
It is also known as Delanipur Mosque or  Jama Mosque.

Prayer
This mosque is a venue of celebration during festivals of Id-Ul-Fitr and Id-Ul-Zuha, by the local Muslim community. The mosque holds prayer sessions every day.

References

Mosques in the Andaman and Nicobar Islands